The Roman Martyrology, which is a non-exhaustive list of saints venerated by the Catholic Church, includes the following feast days for saints who died before Pentecost, and therefore are considered saints of the Old Covenant. Unlike modern saints, these Biblical figures did not go through any formal process of canonization.

Old Testament

 1 May: Jeremiah
 9 May: Isaiah
 10 May: Job
 14 June: Elisha
 15 June: Amos
 1 July: Aaron
 13 July: Ezra
 20 July: Elijah
 1 August: Seven Holy Brothers and Eleazar
 20 August: Samuel
 26 August: Melchizedek
 1 September: Joshua
 4 September: Moses
 6 September: Zechariah
 21 September: Jonah
 26 September: Gideon
 9 October: Abraham
 17 October: Hosea
 19 October: Joel
 19 November: Obadiah
 1 December: Nahum
 2 December: Habakkuk
 3 December: Zephaniah
 16 December: Haggai
 18 December: Malachi
 21 December: Micah
 24 December: All Holy Ancestors of Christ
 29 December: David

New Testament

Although these saints are from the New Testament, they are nevertheless considered "Old Covenant" saints, because they died before the inauguration of the Catholic Church at Pentecost.

 3 February: Saints Simeon and Anna
 19 March and 1 May: Saint Joseph
 25 March: Saint Dismas
 24 June and 29 August: Saint John the Baptist
 26 July: Saints Joachim and Anne (not named in the New Testament, but from that era)
 23 September: Saints Zechariah and Elizabeth
 28 December: Holy Innocents

See also 
 List of Catholic saints
 Roman Martyrology

References 

Roman Martyrology